Elena Slavcheva Bineva (born 18 September 1999) is a retired Bulgarian group rhythmic gymnast. She is the 2018 European and 2018 World Group 5 Hoops champion, the 2017 World Group All-around silver medalist and the 2014 Youth Olympic Group All-around silver medalist.

Career 
She started rhythmic gymnastics at the age of three in club "Levski Iliana". At the age of six she moved to club "Levski", where her coach was Branimira Markova. Bineva became Vice Olympic Champion of the Youth Olympic Games in Nanjing 2014. Later she became part of the new ensemble with Madlen Radukanova, Simona Dyankova, Laura Traets and Teodora Aleksandrova in 2016. Her hobbies are reading, going to the cinema and walking in the park. 

She was later integrated in the Bulgarian group in 2017 and 2018. In February 2017 she suffered a right ankle injury at an event in Moscow, the trauma was extensible ligaments, swelling in the bone and a broken piece that is 6 years old on her right leg and could not compete at the Rumi and Albena international tournament in Varna, Bulgaria. In April 2017 she broke bone in her hand at training when she and one of the other gymnasts hit really bad and bone on her right wrist broke, that is why she performed with linguists at the 2017 World Championships. She kept competing in 2018 despite those injuries and became European and World Champion.

In 2019, she decided to retire to keep the cohesion of the Bulgarian group safe a year before the Olympic Games and to avoid the danger of having to train a new gymnast in a terrible rush a few months before Tokyo if her injury was too painful again.

Personal life  
Eli has 3 sisters (Miroslava, Viki and Martina Bineva) and one brother (Kaloyan Binev). Her father Slavcho Binev won gold at the 1992 European Championships in taekwondo and became a well-known Bulgarian businessman and politician after the end of his sports career and her mother is Maria Bineva.

References

External links
 

Bulgarian rhythmic gymnasts
Gymnasts at the 2014 Summer Youth Olympics
1999 births
Living people
Medalists at the Rhythmic Gymnastics European Championships
Medalists at the Rhythmic Gymnastics World Championships